The Warwick Advertiser is a weekly newspaper in Warwick, New York, United States. 

Established in 1866 by Leonard Cox, by 1877 it reported a circulation of 1,200. As of 2017, it is owned by Straus News.

References

External links
 official website

Weekly newspapers published in the United States
1866 establishments in New York (state)
Publications established in 1866